Fredericksburg Regional Transit or FRED is a bus transit system that operates in and around Fredericksburg, VA. It provides year-round bus service to Spotsylvania and Fredericksburg, with commuter shuttles to the Fredericksburg station for connections to Amtrak and Virginia Railway Express. Most service operates Monday through Friday from 6:00 am to 8:00 pm. It also provides service late nights and on weekends when the University of Mary Washington is in session. The administrative offices and main passenger transfer facility are located at 1400 Emancipation Highway in Fredericksburg, and is commonly known as "FRED Central."

History
FRED was founded in 1996 and has continued to grow as a public transit system. In 1998 the system expanded to Spotsylvania County and in 2001 it began serving Stafford County, with service to Caroline County starting in 2002. In 2007, FRED began offering feeder service to connect to the Virginia Railway Express system.

Routes

Fares
FRED's fares are $1.25 for riders using cash. Students of the University of Mary Washington and Germanna Community College, children under 3, and employees of MediCorp Health System, Star Radio Group, and The Free Lance-Star ride for free. Senior citizens and disabled patrons only pay half fare, or $0.60. VRE Shuttles have a fare of $1.75. FRED offers adult monthly passes for $50 which are valid on regular service routes.

References

External links 

Bus transportation in Virginia
Transit authorities with natural gas buses
Northern Virginia
Transportation in Fredericksburg, Virginia
Transportation in Spotsylvania County, Virginia
1996 establishments in Virginia